Saint-Hippolyte-de-Caton (Provençal: Sent Ipolit de Caton) is a commune in the Gard department in southern France. The archaeologist and epigrapher Émile Espérandieu (1857–1939) was born in the commune.

Population

See also
Communes of the Gard department

References

Communes of Gard